Nadine Laurent is a French Paralympic alpine skier. She won a silver and a bronze medal at the 1992 Winter Paralympic Games in Albertville.

Career 
At the 1992 Winter Paralympics, in Tignes / Albertville, France, she won two medals: a silver medal in the slalom (with a time of 1:25.90 (gold for Austrian athlete Helga Knapp in 1: 24.49 and bronze for Cathy Gentile-Patti in 2: 23.51), and a bronze in the giant slalom in 2:31.80 (finishing behind the American athletes Sarah Billmeier in 2: 22.85 and Cathy Gentile-Patti in 2:23.51).

Laurent placed sixth in the downhill, and fifth in the super-G, in the LW2 category.

At the 1994 Winter Paralympics, in Lillehammer, Norway, Laurent missed the podium, finishing 4th in giant slalom LW2, 6th in downhill LW2, and 7th in super-G LW2.

References 

1959 births
Living people
Sportspeople from Lyon
Paralympic alpine skiers of France
French female alpine skiers
Alpine skiers at the 1992 Winter Paralympics
Alpine skiers at the 1994 Winter Paralympics
Medalists at the 1992 Winter Paralympics
Paralympic silver medalists for France
Paralympic bronze medalists for France